Barrack Square is an open public square on the foreshore of Perth Water on the Swan River, located at the southern end of Barrack Street near the central business district of Perth, Western Australia.

It has also been known as Union Jack Square, Flagstaff Square and Harper Square.

Usage
The Swan Bells are located at Barrack Square, as well as cafés, restaurants and jetties.

There are six jetties (so the area is sometimes referred to as the Barrack Street Jetties), including the Barrack Street Jetty used by Transperth. Commercial companies also use the jetties for trips to Rottnest Island and river cruises.

The West Australian Rowing Club has had a presence adjacent to the square since the nineteenth century.

Redevelopment

As part of the 2012 Perth waterfront development, the Metropolitan Redevelopment Authority are planning and surveying changes to the Barrack Square area.

References

Further reading
 The History and Development of Barrack Square
 Foreshore treasure: The potential archaeology of the buried Port of Perth
 Barrack Square, Heritage Perth

External links
 

Landmarks in Perth, Western Australia
State Register of Heritage Places in the City of Perth
Elizabeth Quay
Barrack Square, Perth